The Supercupa României is a Romanian football championship contested by the winners of the Liga I and the Cupa României. It is usually played at the Arena Națională in Bucharest.

The competition started off in 1994, with the first edition being won by Steaua București. In 2010, for the first time in its history, the Supercup was held even though CFR Cluj had been victorious in both the league and the cup in the previous season. At that time, they faced Unirea Urziceni, the Liga I runners-up.

The most successful performer so far has been FCSB with 6 wins, followed by Rapid București and CFR Cluj with 4 wins each up until 2021.

Sponsorship 
On 22 July 2005, FRF and Samsung Electronics signed a one-year sponsorship deal. The name of the competition was changed to Supercupa României Samsung for the 2005 and 2006 editions.

On 9 October 2006, FRF and Ursus Breweries (part of the SABMiller group) signed a sponsorship agreement for the next three seasons. Ursus Breweries changed the name of the competition to Supercupa României Timișoreana, after the Timișoreana beer brand.

Results of the finals

1 Because CFR Cluj won the double, Unirea Urziceni, the team that was the runner-up of the previous Liga I season, was chosen to play in the Romanian Supercup as their opponent. This rule was adopted in 2009.

2 Because FCSB won the double, ASA Târgu Mureș, the team that was the runner-up of the previous Liga I season, was chosen to play in the Romanian Supercup as their opponent. This rule was adopted in 2009.

Performances

Performance by qualification

Performance by club

Performance by city

Notes

References

External links
Romania - List of Super Cup Finals, RSSSF.com

 
3
Romania